Nicholas Donnelly (13 March 1938 – 9 January 2022) was a British actor who was best known for appearing in the television drama series Grange Hill as Craig MacKenzie from 1985 to 1993, and as Sergeant Johnny Wills in police series Dixon of Dock Green from 1960 to 1976.

Life and career
Donnelly was born in Kensington, London on 13 March 1938. He met his future wife, Alrun, whilst undertaking National Service in Germany during the late 1950s.

Donnelly was a supporter of the football team Queens Park Rangers. He had two sons and twin daughters, as well as five grandchildren. Donnelly died on 9 January 2022, at the age of 83.

Filmography

References

External links

Aveleyman: Nicholas Donnelly

1938 births
2022 deaths
20th-century English male actors
English male television actors
Male actors from London
People from Kensington